Edward Francis DeLong (born 1958), is a marine microbiologist and professor in the Department of Oceanography at the University of Hawaii, Manoa, and is considered a pioneer in the field of metagenomics. He is best known for his discovery of the bacterial use of the rhodopsin protein in converting sunlight to biochemical energy in marine microbial communities.

Early life and education
DeLong was born in Sonoma, California. He studied biology at Santa Rosa Junior College and obtained an A.S. degree in 1980. While continuing his education at the University of California, Davis, DeLong had originally planned on becoming a medical technologist, but after a meeting and working as an undergraduate researcher with bacteriologist Paul Baumann, he found a new interest in marine microbiology. He graduated with a B.S. degree in bacteriology at UCD in 1982 and moved to the Scripps Institution of Oceanography, where he received a Ph.D. in marine biology after finishing doctoral work with Art Yayanos in 1986. DeLong completed his postdoctoral training at Indiana University in Bloomington with Norman Pace, where he surveyed communities of picoplankton via DNA sequencing.

Work

With Pace and his group at Indiana University, DeLong developed a method that can be used to identify single cells phylogenetically through the use of phylogenetic stains. These rRNA-based probes identify the cells based on the binding of fluorescent probes to individual cells through use of oligonucleotides that are complementary to 16S rRNA sequences of specific phylogenetic groups. The use of multiple probes with different fluorescent dyes allows for the identification of different cell types in the same field.

DeLong subsequently expanded upon this work and applied gene cloning and sequencing to the study of complex marine microbial communities and their role in the biosphere. These techniques carried significance in that microbes could be studied without the use of a standard microbial culture.

After receiving an independent study award in 1989, DeLong spent some time at the Woods Hole Oceanographic Institute in Woods Hole, Massachusetts, and would later on become Associate Professor in the Biology and Ecology, Evolution, and Marine Biology Departments at the University of California, Santa Barbara. DeLong's surveys during his time at UCSB led him to participate in the study of widespread abundance and diversity of marine archaea in the world's oceans. Prior to 1992, archaea were thought only to exist in the extreme environments of hypersaline lakes, hydrothermal vents, and similar places. This changed the general view of the scientific community on the role of archaea in the biosphere and opened up new possibilities in applied potential of such microbial assemblages.

In the years following, DeLong's work took him to the Monterey Bay Aquarium Research Institute and it is during his time there that he made a crucial discovery in the understanding of the Earth's carbon and energy cycles. A team of microbiologists led by DeLong discovered a gene in several species of bacteria responsible for production of the protein rhodopsin, previously unheard of in the domain Bacteria. These proteins found in the cell membranes are capable of converting light energy to biochemical energy due to a change in configuration of the rhodopsin molecule as sunlight strikes it, causing the pumping of a proton from inside out and a subsequent inflow that generates the energy. In 2004, DeLong moved to the Massachusetts Institute of Technology, where he worked on developing gene expression studies targeting microbial communities in the wild. In 2014, DeLong relocated to the University of Hawaii, where he serves as co-director for the Center for Microbial Oceanography: Research and Education, C-MORE and the Simons Collaboration on Ocean Processes and Ecology,  SCOPE.

Honoraria, fellowships, and memberships
Honorary Professorship, University of Queensland, Brisbane, Australia, 1999–2002
Elected Fellow in the American Academy of Microbiology, August 2000
Moore Investigator in Marine Microbiology, August, 2004
Elected Fellow in the American Academy of Arts and Sciences, May 2005
In April 2008, DeLong was presented with the Vladimir Ivanovich Vernadsky Medal for “important contributions to geomicrobiology and biogeochemical cycling through the innovative use of molecular tools and a genomic approach” at the European Geosciences Union
Elected Fellow in the National Academy of Sciences, April 2008
The American Society for Microbiology presented DeLong with the Procter & Gamble Award in Applied and Environmental Microbiology in May 2008 and the D.C. White Research and Mentoring Award in February 2009
Elected Fellow in the American Association for the Advancement of Science, 2011
UC Davis College of Biological Sciences Outstanding Alumni Award, UC Davis, 2012
Moore Investigator in Marine Microbiology, 2012
A.G. Huntsman Award for Excellence in the Marine Sciences, 2014
Elected Member in the European Molecular Biology Association EMBO, 2015
Elected President of the International Society for Microbial Ecology (ISME)

See also

Thermoproteota
Proteorhodopsin

References

External links
 DeLong Research Group Official Website
 Edward DeLong faculty page at MIT
 Edward DeLong Curriculum Vitae
 DeLong University of Hawaii

American microbiologists
Massachusetts Institute of Technology faculty
Science teachers
Living people
Members of the United States National Academy of Sciences
Geomicrobiologists
University of California, Davis alumni
Fellows of the American Academy of Microbiology
1958 births